Hilde Weissner (3 July 1909 – 30 May 1987) was a German actress.

Life and career
Born on 3 July 1909 in Stettin, Germany (in what is, today, Szczecin, Poland), Hilde Weissner made her theatrical acting debut at the Schiller-Theatre in Hamburg-Altona in 1929, and then began her film career in 1934. She died on 30 May 1987 in Braunau am Inn, Braunau am Inn Bezirk, Upper Austria, and was laid to rest at the Ohlsdorfer Friedhof Cemetery on Ohlsdorf, Hamburg, Germany.

Selected filmography
 The Grand Duke's Finances (1934)
 Decoy (1934)
 Pappi (1934)
 What Am I Without You (1934)
 The Castle in Flanders (1936)
 The Dreamer (1936)
 The Man Who Was Sherlock Holmes (1937)
 Ball at the Metropol (1937)
 The Muzzle (1938)
 Secret Code LB 17 (1938)
 All Lies (1938)
 Freight from Baltimore (1938)
 The Impossible Mister Pitt (1938)
 Marriage in Small Doses (1939)
 A Man Astray (1940)
 Beloved Augustin (1940)
 Diesel (1942)
 Melody of a Great City (1943)
 The Noltenius Brothers (1945)
 Tromba (1949)
 The Perfect Couple (1954)
 Beloved Enemy (1955)
  (1956)

References

External links

1909 births
1987 deaths
Actors from Szczecin
German film actresses
20th-century German actresses